"Ra-Ta-Ta", or "Ra Ta-Ta-Ta" is a 1970 German song written by Hamburg pianist Chris Juwens (real name Uwe Stelzmann; 1946-1998) and Christian Heilburg (real name Gregor Rottschalk, *01/12/1945). Gunter Gabriel of CBS Records Germany heard the song's catchy potential right away, but his boss dissuaded him. Nevertheless the song swept across Europe with singles in many other European languages. The English version of the song by German band Rotation was promoted in the US as a result of the Top 10 success of singer Antoine's French version in Paris.

Versions
"Ra Ta Ta Ta Ta", :de:Andy Fisher; Juwens, German lyrics C. Heilburg, Germany	1970
"Ra-ta-ta", Globetrotters; Germany
"Ra-Ta-Ta", Gregor; Germany 1970
"Ra Ta Ta", German studio band Rotation, with new English lyrics by Gregor Rottschalk
"Ra-Ta-Ta", Los Javaloyas; C. Juwens, C. Heilburg,  Spanish lyrics M. Clavero  1971
"Ra Ta Ta", Klaas & Peter (:nl:Klaas Leyen :nl:Peter Schoonhoven)  in Dutch 1970
"Ra-Ta-Ta", Antoine; Juwens, Heilburg, French lyrics Similie, Delancray 1970
"Ra-Ta-Ta", Fredi (singer);  Chris Juwens, Finnish lyrics by Georg Dolivo	1971
"Ra-Ta-Ta", Scotch Mist (Pilot); 1974
"Ra-Ta-Ta-Ta",	:da:Johnny Reimar; Juwens, Heilburg, Danish lyrics by Viggo Happel	1971
"Ra Ta-Ta-Ta", :da:The Lollipops; Danish lyrics 1970,

References

1970 songs